Ellida caniplaga, the linden prominent moth, is a moth of the  family Notodontidae. It is found from Texas to Florida, north to New Brunswick, west to Ontario and Minnesota.

The wingspan is 34–44 mm. Adults are on wing from April to September. There are two generations per year in the south.

The larvae feed on the leaves of Tilia species. They usually feed high in the canopy of their host plant. The larvae are highly variable in their coloration. The species overwinters in the soil in the pupal stage.

References

Moths described in 1856
Notodontidae
Moths of North America